James Wilkinson (born 28 February 1951) won a silver medal in sailing for Ireland with partner David Wilkins at the 1980 Moscow Olympics in the Flying Dutchman class. The sailing events took place at Pirita Yachting Club in Tallinn, Estonia.

See also
Ireland at the 1976 Summer Olympics
Ireland at the 1980 Summer Olympics
Sailing at the 1980 Summer Olympics

References

1951 births
Living people
Olympic sailors of Ireland
Irish male sailors (sport)
Olympic silver medalists for Ireland
Sailors at the 1976 Summer Olympics – Flying Dutchman
Sailors at the 1980 Summer Olympics – Flying Dutchman
Olympic medalists in sailing
Medalists at the 1980 Summer Olympics